Committee on Naval Affairs may refer to:

United States House Committee on Naval Affairs
United States Senate Committee on Naval Affairs